Ron Moody (born Ronald Moodnick; 8 January 1924 – 11 June 2015) was an English actor, composer, singer and writer. He was best known for his portrayal of Fagin in Oliver! (1968) and its 1983 Broadway revival. Moody earned a Golden Globe Award and an Academy Award nomination for the film, as well as a Tony Award nomination for the stage production. Other notable projects include The Mouse on the Moon (1963), Mel Brooks' The Twelve Chairs (1970) and Flight of the Doves (1971), in which Moody shared the screen with Oliver! co-star Jack Wild.

Early life
Moody was born on 8 January 1924 in Tottenham, Middlesex, the son of Kate (née Ogus; 1898–1980) and Bernard/Barnett Moodnick (1896–1964), a studio executive. His father was a Russian Jew and his mother was a Lithuanian Jew;  said Moody, "I'm 100% Jewish—totally kosher!" He was a cousin of director Laurence Moody and actress Clare Lawrence. His surname was legally changed to the more anglicised Moody in 1930.

Education
Moody was educated at Southgate County School, which at the time was a state grammar school, and based in Palmers Green,  Middlesex, followed by the London School of Economics in Central London, where he trained to become an economist. During World War II he enlisted in the Royal Air Force (RAF) and became a radar technician.

Life and career
Despite training to be an economist, Moody began appearing in theatrical shows and later decided to become a professional actor.

Moody worked in a variety of genres, but is perhaps best known for his starring role as Fagin in Lionel Bart's stage and film musical Oliver! based on Oliver Twist by Charles Dickens. He created the role in the original West End production in 1960, and reprised it in the 1984 Broadway revival, receiving a Tony Award nomination for Best Actor in a Musical. For his performance in the 1968 film  Oliver!, he received the Golden Globe Award for Best Actor (Musical/Comedy), the Best Actor award at the 6th Moscow International Film Festival and an Academy Award nomination in the same category. Reflecting on the role, Moody states: "Fate destined me to play Fagin. It was the part of a lifetime. That summer of 1967 [during filming] was one of the happiest times of my life". He reprised his role as Fagin in the 1983 Channel 4 television programme The Other Side of London, and again at the 1985 Royal Variety Performance in Theatre Royal, Drury Lane before Queen Elizabeth II and the Duke of Edinburgh.

Moody appeared in several children's television series, including the voice of Badger and Toad in the TV Adaptation of Colin Dann's The Animals of Farthing Wood, Noah's Island, Telebugs, and Into the Labyrinth. Among his better known roles was that of Prime Minister Rupert Mountjoy in the comedy The Mouse on the Moon (1963), alongside Margaret Rutherford, with whom he appeared again the following year in Murder Most Foul (1964), one of Rutherford's Miss Marple films. He played French entertainer and mime artist The Great Orlando in the 1963 Cliff Richard film Summer Holiday. He appeared as Hopkirk in the 1966 episode entitled "Honey For the Prince" of The Avengers. He acted again with former Oliver! co-star Jack Wild in Flight of the Doves (1971). 

In 1969, Moody was offered, but declined, the lead role in Doctor Who, following the departure of Patrick Troughton from the part.  He later told many people (including Doctor Who companion Elisabeth Sladen) that declining the role was a decision he subsequently regretted. He played Ippolit Vorobyaninov alongside Frank Langella (as Ostap Bender) in Mel Brooks' version of The Twelve Chairs (1970). In 2003, he starred in the black comedy Paradise Grove alongside Rula Lenska, and played Edwin Caldecott, an old nemesis of Jim Branning on the BBC soap EastEnders. In 2005, he acted in the Big Finish Productions Doctor Who audio play Other Lives, playing the Duke of Wellington. He made several appearances in BBC TVs long running variety show, The Good Old Days, enacting pastiche/comic Victorian melodramas.

Moody wrote a novel, The Devil You Don't, which was published by Robson Books, London, in 1980. 

In 2004, the British ITV1 nostalgia series After They Were Famous hosted a documentary of the surviving cast of the film Oliver! Several of the film's musical numbers were reenacted. Moody, then 80 but still spry, and Jack Wild (seriously ill with oral cancer at the time) recreated their dance from the closing credits of the film.

Moody appeared in an episode of BBC1's Casualty (aired on 30 January 2010) as a Scottish patient who had served with the Black Watch during the Second World War. On 30 June 2010, Moody appeared on stage at the end of a performance of Cameron Mackintosh's revival of Oliver! and made a humorous speech about the show's 50th anniversary. He then reprised the "Pick a Pocket or Two" number with the cast.

Family
Moody married a Pilates teacher, Therese Blackbourn, in 1985. The couple had six children.

Death
Moody died of natural causes while in a London hospital on 11 June 2015, aged 91.

Partial filmography

 Davy (1958) – The Unicyclist (uncredited)
 Follow a Star (1959) – Violinist
 Make Mine Mink (1960) – Jelks (uncredited)
 Five Golden Hours (1961) – Gabrielle
 A Pair of Briefs (1962) – Sidney Pudney
 Summer Holiday (1963) – Orlando
 The Mouse on the Moon (1963) – Prime Minister Rupert Mountjoy
 Ladies Who Do (1963) – Police Inspector
 Murder Most Foul (1964) – H. Driffold Cosgood
 Every Day's a Holiday (1964) – Professor Bastinado
 San Ferry Ann (1965) – German
 The Sandwich Man (1966) – Rowing Coach
 Oliver! (1968) – Fagin
 David Copperfield (1969, TV Movie) – Uriah Heep
 The Twelve Chairs (1970) – Vorobyaninov
 Flight of the Doves (1971) – Hawk Dove
 The Edwardians (1972–1973, TV miniseries) – Robert Baden-Powell
 Legend of the Werewolf (1975) – Zoo Keeper
 Dogpound Shuffle (1975) – Steps
 Closed Up-Tight (1975)
 Starsky & Hutch (1976, TV Series) – Derek Stafford
 The Strange Case of the End of Civilization as We Know It (1977) – Dr Henry Gropinger
 Dominique (1978) – Dr. Rogers
 The Word (1978, TV Mini-Series) – LeBrun
 Unidentified Flying Oddball, aka The Spaceman and King Arthur (1979) – Merlin
 Tales of the Unexpected (1980, TV Episode) – Richard Pratt
 Nobody's Perfect (1980, TV Series) – Inspector Roger Hart 
 Into the Labyrinth (1981, TV Series) – Rothgo
 Othello (1981, TV Movie) – Iago
 Dial M for Murder (1981, TV movie) – Capt. Lesgate
 Wrong Is Right (1982) – King Awad
 Where Is Parsifal? (1983) – Beersbohm
 Hart to Hart (1983) – Charles Thompson
 The Other Side of London (1983)
 The Telebugs (1986–1987, TV Series) – (voice)
 Asterix and the Big Fight (1989) – Prolix (English version, voice)
 A Ghost in Monte Carlo (1990, TV Movie) – Alphonse
 How's Business (1991) – Pawnshop broker
 Emily's Ghost (1992) – Dawson
 The Animals of Farthing Wood (1993–1995, TV Mini-Series) – Toad / Badger / Bully / Spike / Large Town Rat (voice)
 A Kid in King Arthur's Court (1995) – Merlin
 Noah's Island (1997–1999) – (voice)
 The 3 Kings (2000) – King Herod
 Revelation (2001) – Sir Isaac Newton
 Paradise Grove (2003) – Izzie Goldberg
 Lost Dogs (2005) – Maurice Todd
 Moussaka & Chips (2005) – Officer David Tomlinson

References

External links

 Ron Moody's Official Charitable Website
 
 
 
 Interview British Entertainment History Project

1924 births
2015 deaths
20th-century English comedians
20th-century English male actors
21st-century English comedians
21st-century English male actors
Alumni of the London School of Economics
Audiobook narrators
Best Musical or Comedy Actor Golden Globe (film) winners
British male film actors
English Jews
English male comedians
English male film actors
English male musical theatre actors
English male stage actors
English male television actors
English male voice actors
English people of Lithuanian-Jewish descent
English people of Russian-Jewish descent
Jewish English male actors
Jewish male comedians
Male actors from London
People educated at Southgate School
People from Harringay
People from Hornsey
People from Tottenham
Royal Air Force airmen
Royal Air Force personnel of World War II